Charley Creek is a stream in the U.S. state of Washington. It is a tributary of Clallam River.

Charley Creek was named after Charles Welker, a pioneer settler.

See also
List of rivers of Washington

References

Rivers of Clallam County, Washington
Rivers of Washington (state)